Bruce was a rural parliamentary electorate in the Otago region of New Zealand, from 1861 to 1922. For part of the 1860s with the influx to Otago of gold-miners it was a multi-member constituency with two members.

Population centres
In 1865 the Bruce electorate included Tokomairiro, Waihola, East Taieri, suburbs of Dunedin, Inch Clutha, Lawrence, Warepa and Pomahaka.

History
The Bruce electorate was formed in the 1860 electoral redistribution. It covered the rural area surrounding Dunedin that had previously been part of the Dunedin Country electorate. The Bruce electorate was a two-member constituency. The electorate was named after Robert the Bruce who was King of Scotland from 1306 to 1329.

Charles Kettle and Thomas Gillies were the only two candidates for the newly constituted two-member electorate of Bruce. They were thus declared elected unopposed on 11 February 1861.

Kettle died on 5 June 1862. Edward Cargill succeeded him in the 1862 by-election.

Thomas Gillies resigned in 1865 and the subsequent by-election was contested by William John Dyer and Arthur John Burns. On 8 April 1865, Burns and Dyer received 102 and 78 votes. Burns was thus declared elected.

Later in 1865, Edward Cargill resigned. The resulting by-election, held on 26 July, was contested by James Macandrew and John Cargill. Macandrew and J. Cargill received 207 and 34 votes, and Macandrew was declared elected.

From the 1866 general election, Bruce was a single-member electorate. John Cargill was its first representative, and he resigned in 1870. James Clark Brown won the 1870 by-election on 21 March. Brown stood for Tuapeka in the 1871 general election. William Murray won the 1871 election for Bruce, was confirmed in 1876 and 1879, but defeated in 1881 by James Rutherford, who died in 1883. James McDonald won the 1883 by-election, but was defeated at the 1884 general election.

Robert Gillies won the 1884 general election, but resigned on 30 June 1885. Donald Reid won the resulting 1885 by-election, but was defeated at the 1887 general election by Crawford Anderson. He retired at the end of the term, and the 1890 general election was won by James William Thomson, who resigned again in 1892.

The later Defence Minister James Allen won the 1892 by-election and held the seat until 1920, when he resigned. John Edie was successful in the 1920 by-election, and when the electorate was abolished in 1922, he successfully stood for Clutha.

Members of Parliament
Bruce was represented by 16 Members of Parliament.

Key:

1861 to 1866
Bruce was a two-member electorate from 1861 to 1866.

1866 to 1922
From 1866 to 1922, Bruce was a single-member electorate.

Election results

1920 by-election

1919 election

1899 election

1892 by-election

1890 election

1885 by-election

1883 by-election

1871 election

July 1865 by-election

April 1865 by-election

1862 by-election

Notes

References
 
 
 
 

Historical electorates of New Zealand
1860 establishments in New Zealand
1922 disestablishments in New Zealand
Politics of Otago